Amapiano (Zulu or Xhosa for "the pianos") is a subgenre of house music that emerged in South Africa in the mid-2010s. It is a hybrid of deep house, jazz and lounge music characterized by synths and wide percussive basslines.

It is distinguished by high-pitched piano melodies, Kwaito basslines, low tempo 1990s South African house rhythms and percussions from another local subgenre of house known as Tribal house.

Origins 
Although the genre gained popularity in Katlehong, the township east of Johannesburg, there is a lot of ambiguity and debate concerning its origins, with various accounts of the musical styles in the Johannesburg townships – Soweto, Alexandra, Vosloorus and Katlehong. Because of the genre's similarities with Bacardi, some people assert the genre began in Pretoria. Various accounts as to who formed the popular genre make it impossible to accurately pinpoint its origins.

An important element of the genre is the use of the "log drum", a wide percussive bassline, whose creation has been attributed to MDU aka TRP. Amapiano pioneer Kabza De Small stated:

I don’t know what happened. I don't know how he figured out the log drum. Amapiano music has always been there, but he’s the one who came up with the log drum sound. These boys like experimenting. They always check out new plug-ins. So when Mdu figured it out, he ran with it.

Artists and DJs
For a list of amapiano producers, vocalists and disc jockeys, see: Amapiano musicians.

Popularity 
In 2019, the genre experienced increased popularity across the African continent with noted increases in digital streams and chart successes in countries far from its South African origin.

In 2021, an awards ceremony was created that was dedicated to the genre, the South African Amapiano Music Awards.

In 2022, the American online music store Beatport added the genre to its platform with its own dedicated charts and playlists.

The genre was popular amongst young people on the platform TikTok, which saw various dance challenges being made, which fueled the dancing scene in South Africa.

References

African electronic dance music
House music genres
South African styles of music